Christopher Small (born 26 September 1973) is a retired Scottish professional snooker player and now a qualified snooker coach. His playing career was ended by the spinal condition ankylosing spondylitis.

Career
At age 15, Small was the number 1 under-19 player in Scotland. He turned professional the following year. In 1992, he won the Benson & Hedges Championship, defeating Alan McManus in the final, and in 1995 he reached the Semi-finals of the Welsh Open, and was again a semi-finalist at the 1998 Grand Prix event.
His greatest achievement was winning the 2002 LG Cup, beating Ronnie O'Sullivan and John Higgins, before a 9–5 win over Alan McManus in the final. This followed a season in which he won only three matches, owing to the severity of his medical condition. He reached the quarter-finals of the LG Cup in the following season.

The 2003/2004 season ended with him having to pull out of a World Championship match against Alan McManus while trailing 1–7, as the regular steroid injections he required in his neck caused problems with his vision. The 2004–05 season was disastrous for him, as he lost all his ranking tournament matches, and in September 2005 he announced his retirement from the game. Small then started coaching other players, but by 2009 his condition had worsened, and he had to give up coaching.

Despite being the youngest player ever to win on his Crucible debut (10–7 against Doug Mountjoy aged 18 in 1992), he never progressed beyond the last-16 in the World Championship. He was a regular in the top 32 for several years, but his LG Cup win helped him reach #12 for the 2004–05 season, the only time he had entered the top 16. His career-high break was a 141.

He applied for a grant from a trust fund for players who have fallen on hard times from the World Professional Billiards and Snooker Association, but was rejected. This decision, stemming from Small's refusal to provide a £250 medical certificate, has been criticised by figures including Jimmy White, Graeme Dott ("Everybody in the game that I've spoken to is behind him") and Clive Everton.

In 2012, improved medication allowed Small to return to coaching, one of his players being former snooker professional Michael Leslie.

Personal life
Small is the son of a taxi driver. He worked as a bank clerk before his success in snooker. Small and his wife Clare have four children.

Performance and rankings timeline

Career finals

Ranking finals: 1 (1 title)

Minor-ranking finals: 1 (1 title)

Non-ranking finals: 2

Team finals: 1

References

Scottish snooker players
1973 births
Living people